Michael Lloyd is a special effects artist who was nominated at the 58th Academy Awards in the category of Best Visual Effects for his work on the film Return to Oz. He shared his nomination with Zoran Perisic, Will Vinton, and Ian Wingrove.

Selected filmography 

 Raiders of the Lost Ark (1981)
 Baby: Secret of the Lost Legend (1985)
 Return to Oz (1985)
 Superman IV: The Quest for Peace (1987)
 Dick Tracy (1990)
 Independence Day (1996)
 The Lord of the Rings: The Fellowship of the Ring (2001)
 The Lord of the Rings: The Two Towers (2002)
 The Chronicles of Narnia: The Lion, the Witch and the Wardrobe (2005)
 Avatar (2009)

References

External links 
 

Living people
Special effects people
Year of birth missing (living people)